Mayfair is a district in the City of Westminster in London, England.

Mayfair may also refer to:

Geography

Canada
 Mayfair, Calgary, Alberta, a neighbourhood
 Mayfair, Saskatchewan, a hamlet
 Mayfair, Saskatoon, Saskatchewan, a neighbourhood
 Mayfair, a community in the township of Southwest Middlesex, Ontario

United States
 Mayfair, Fresno County, California, a census-designated place
 Mayfair, Kern County, California, an unincorporated community
 Mayfair, Philadelphia, Pennsylvania, a neighborhood
 Mayfair, Washington, D.C., a neighborhood
 Mayfair, a shopping area in the Coconut Grove neighborhood of Miami, Florida
 Mayfair, a neighborhood in Johns Creek, Georgia
 Mayfair, a neighborhood within the larger community area of Albany Park, Chicago, Illinois
 Mayfair (Metra), a commuter railroad station in Chicago, Illinois

Elsewhere
 Mayfair, Johannesburg, a suburb of Johannesburg, South Africa
 Mayfair, a suburb of Hastings, New Zealand

People
 Billy Mayfair (born 1966), American professional golfer
 Mitzi Mayfair (1914–1976), American dancer and actress born Emylyn Pique

Fictional characters
 Katherine Mayfair, on the television series Desperate Housewives
 Adam Mayfair, Katherine's second husband
 Dylan Mayfair, Katherine's daughter
 Monk Mayfair, one of Doc Savage's five assistants
 A family of witches, in the novel series Lives of the Mayfair Witches by Anne Rice

Arts and entertainment
 Mayfair (festival), an annual arts and music festival in Allentown, Pennsylvania
 Mayfair (magazine), a British soft pornographic magazine
 "Mayfair", a song by Nick Drake from Time of No Reply
 Mayfair Pictures, an American film studio of the 1930s
 Mayfair (film), a 2018 South African action drama

Brands and enterprises
 Mayfair (cigarette), a brand of cigarettes produced by the Gallaher Group
 Dodge Mayfair, an automobile built for the Canadian market from 1953 to 1959
 Packard Mayfair, an automobile manufactured up to 1954
 Mayfair Bank, a commercial bank in Kenya
 Mayfair Club, a defunct underground poker club in New York City
 Mayfair Games, a publisher of board and roleplaying games
 The May Fair Hotel, London
 Mayfair Hotel (St. Louis, Missouri)
 Mayfair Markets, U.S. supermarkets that were sold off or absorbed into the Gelson's chain
 Mayfair Mall, a shopping mall in Wauwatosa, Wisconsin
 Mayfair Shopping Centre, Victoria, British Columbia, Canada
 Mayfair Studios, a recording studio in London
 Mayfair Tankers, a merchant shipping company

Venues and theaters
 Mayfair Ballroom, a former venue in Newcastle upon Tyne
 Mayfair Music Hall, Santa Monica, California, a vaudeville theater demolished in 2010
 Mayfair Theatre, Baltimore, United States
 Mayfair Theatre, Dunedin, New Zealand
 Mayfair Theatre, Ottawa, Canada, a movie theatre

American historic structures
 Mayfair (Jenkinsville, South Carolina), a historic home
 Mayfair Hotel (Searcy, Arkansas), converted into an apartment house
 Mayfair House, Philadelphia, Pennsylvania, an apartment building
 Mayfair Mansions Apartments, Washington, D.C.
 Mayfair Pumping Station, Chicago

Schools
 Truman College, formerly Mayfair College, Chicago
 Mayfair High School a middle/high school in Lakewood, California

Sports
 Mayfair Open, an LPGA golf tournament held only in 1959
 Mayfair Sporting Club, London, an organiser of boxing dinner events

Other uses
 Mayfair salad dressing